Wilton by-election may refer to one of several parliamentary by-elections held for the British House of Commons constituency of Wilton in Wiltshire:

 1841 Wilton by-election
 1855 Wilton by-election
 1877 Wilton by-election
 1900 Wilton by-election
 1918 Wilton by-election

See also 
 Wilton (UK Parliament constituency)